The women's pole vault event  at the 1999 IAAF World Indoor Championships was held on March 5.

Results

References
Results

Pole
Pole vault at the World Athletics Indoor Championships
1999 in women's athletics